William or Willie Lewis may refer to:

Politicians
 William Lewis (MP for Anglesey) (by 1526–1601 or later), MP for Anglesey in 1553 and 1555
 William Lewis (MP for Helston), MP for Helston in 1584
 William Lewis (MP for King's Lynn) (died 1593), MP for King's Lynn in 1593
 William Lewis (MP for Cardiff), MP for Cardiff in 1601
 Sir William Lewis, 1st Baronet (1598–1677), MP for Petersfield, Breconshire and Lymington
 William Lewis (MP for Devizes) (1625–1661), MP for Devizes, 1660–1661
 William J. Lewis (1766–1828), U.S. Representative from Virginia
 William Lewis (Australian politician) (1818–1895), businessman and politician of Kapunda, South Australia
 William Lewis (New York politician) (1827–1891), New York politician
 William James Lewis (1830–1910), physician and politician in New Brunswick, Canada
 William Lewis (Kentucky politician) (1868–1959), U.S. Representative from Kentucky
 William Lewis, 3rd Baron Merthyr (1901–1977), Deputy Speaker of the House of Lords
 William E. Lewis (1918-1989), Missouri politician

Sportspeople
 William H. Lewis (1868–1949), first African-American All-American football player and United States Assistant Attorney General
 William Lewis (athlete) (1876–1962), American hurdler in the 1900 Olympic Games
 William Ian Lewis (cricketer) (1935–2004), Irish cricketer
 William Lewis (cricketer) (1807–1889), English cricketer
 William Lewis (figure skater), former Canadian figure skater
 William Lewis (football) (1860–1916), association football referee, and secretary of Chelsea F.C.
 William Lewis (chess player) (1787–1870), English chess competitor and author
 William Lewis (Antigua and Barbuda footballer), former Antigua and Barbuda association football player and coach
 Will Lewis (American football) (born 1958), American football executive and former cornerback
 Willie Lewis (boxer) (1884–1949), American boxer

Arts
 William Lewis (tenor) (born 1935), American operatic tenor
 Willie Lewis (1905–1971), jazz clarinettist
 Willie Lewis (rockabilly musician) (born 1946), musician and founder of Rock-A-Billy Records
 William Lewis (journalist) (born 1969), British journalist and editor
 William Thomas Lewis (1748–1811), English actor
 Willard Louis (1882–1926), American actor who was sometimes credited as William Lewis
 Spliff Star (William A. Lewis, born 1971), American rapper

Scientists
 William Lewis (chemist) (1869–1963), Professor of Chemistry at Exeter University
 William Lewis (mineralogist) (1847–1926), professor of mineralogy at Cambridge University
 William Lewis (physical chemist) (1885–1956), propounded collision theory
 William Lewis (scientist) (1708–1781), English scientist and physician
 William M. Lewis Sr. (1921–2010), fish biologist

Businessmen
 William Lewis, 1st Baron Merthyr (1837–1914), Welsh coal mining magnate
 William D. Lewis, 19th-century banker, merchant, and railroad executive
 William Turnor Lewis (1840–1915), Wisconsin businessman and state legislator

Other
 William Lewis (pirate) (fl. 1687-?), English pirate (possibly fictional)
 William Lewis (judge) (1752–1819), United States federal judge
 William B. Lewis (New York treasurer) (c. 1816–1884), New York State treasurer, 1862–1863
 William Berkeley Lewis (1784–1866), confidant of Andrew Jackson and auditor of the U.S. Treasury
 William Garrett Lewis (1821–1885), British Baptist preacher
 William Draper Lewis (1867–1949), dean of the University of Pennsylvania Law School; founding director of the American Law Institute
 William G. Lewis (1835–1901), Confederate general in the American Civil War
 Sir W. Arthur Lewis (William Arthur Lewis, 1915–1991), Saint Lucian economist
 William Mather Lewis (1878–1945), President of George Washington and Lafayette Universities and a government official
 William F. Lewis (1902–1964), Episcopal bishop

Companies 
 William Lewis & Son Co., a Chicago-based orchestral string instrument company acquired in 1995 by Selmer

See also
 Bill Lewis (disambiguation)
 William Louis, Count of Nassau-Dillenburg (1560–1620)